The Women's keirin at the European Track Championships was first competed in 2010 in Poland.

The Keirin consists of several rounds with heats until the final.

Medalists

References

2010 Results
2011 Results
2012 Results

 
Women's keirin
Women's keirin